
Gmina Chełmek is an urban-rural gmina (administrative district) in Oświęcim County, Lesser Poland Voivodeship, in southern Poland.

Villages
Apart from the town of Chełmek, Gmina Chełmek contains the villages of Bobrek and Gorzów.

Neighbouring gminas
Gmina Chełmek is bordered by the towns of Bieruń, Imielin, Jaworzno and Oświęcim, and by the gminas of Chełm Śląski, Libiąż and Oświęcim.

References
Polish official population figures 2006

Chelmek
Oświęcim County